Dicranoptycha is a genus of crane fly in the family Limoniidae.

Species

D. acanthophallus Alexander, 1940
D. acuterebra Alexander, 1960
D. atricolor Alexander, 1920
D. atripes Alexander, 1963
D. aurogeniculata Alexander, 1951
D. australis Alexander, 1926
D. azrael Alexander, 1953
D. basitarsata Alexander, 1960
D. breviterebra Alexander, 1960
D. byersi Young, 1987
D. caesia Alexander, 1928
D. cinerascens (Meigen, 1818)
D. confluens Alexander, 1923
D. costaricensis Alexander, 1939
D. diacaena Alexander, 1963
D. diacantha Alexander, 1938
D. edashigeana Alexander, 1955
D. elsa Alexander, 1929
D. formosensis Alexander, 1928
D. freidbergi Stary, 1994
D. fuscescens (Schummel, 1829)
D. geniculata Alexander, 1928
D. germana Osten Sacken, 1860
D. griveaudi Alexander, 1965
D. harpyia Alexander, 1946
D. hasegawai Alexander, 1955
D. ibo Alexander, 1976
D. issikina Alexander, 1930
D. keiserae Alexander, 1963
D. kenyana Séguy, 1938
D. kwangtungensis Alexander, 1942
D. laevis Alexander, 1948
D. lataurata Alexander, 1963
D. leucopoda Alexander, 1953
D. linsdalei Alexander, 1966
D. livescens Loew, 1871
D. longipennis Alexander, 1963
D. luteipes Alexander, 1923
D. machidana Alexander, 1932
D. malabarica Alexander, 1941
D. matengoensis Alexander, 1970
D. megaphallus Alexander, 1926
D. melampygia Alexander, 1950
D. minima Alexander, 1919
D. mirabilis Savchenko, 1970
D. natalia Alexander, 1920
D. nigripes Osten Sacken, 1860
D. nigrogenualis Alexander, 1949
D. nigrotibialis Alexander, 1934
D. nox Alexander, 1960
D. occidentalis Alexander, 1927
D. pachystyla Alexander, 1963
D. pallida Alexander, 1926
D. paralivescens Stary, 1972
D. patens Alexander, 1960
D. phallosomica Alexander, 1937
D. pholiota Alexander, 1963
D. polysticta Alexander, 1953
D. prolongata Alexander, 1938
D. pseudocinerea Stary, 1972
D. quadrivittata Alexander, 1919
D. recurvispina Savchenko, 1974
D. robinsoni Alexander, 1958
D. rubronigra Alexander, 1955
D. savtshenkoi Mendl, 1976
D. septemtrionis Alexander, 1926
D. sobrina Osten Sacken, 1860
D. spinifera Young, 1987
D. spinigera Alexander, 1958
D. spinosissima Alexander, 1950
D. squamigera Alexander, 1963
D. stenophallus Alexander, 1950
D. strictoneura Alexander, 1953
D. stuckenbergi Alexander, 1970
D. stygipes Alexander, 1938
D. suensoniana Alexander, 1941
D. tennessa Alexander, 1941
D. tigrina Alexander, 1919
D. trochanterata Speiser, 1908
D. venosa Alexander, 1924
D. verticillata Alexander, 1958
D. vulpes Alexander, 1935
D. winnemana Alexander, 1916
D. yamata Alexander, 1919

References

Limoniidae
Nematocera genera